The Haunted Showboat is the thirty-fifth book in the Nancy Drew mystery series.  It was first published in 1957 under the pseudonym Carolyn Keene.  The actual author was ghostwriter  Harriet Stratemeyer Adams.

Plot 

Nancy, Bess, and George travel to New Orleans for Mardi Gras, but they are then enveloped into a mystery involving an old showboat that is said to be haunted. Nancy then uncovers an imposter and searches for buried pirate gold.

References

See also
Mardi Gras in New Orleans

Nancy Drew books
1957 American novels
1957 children's books
Novels set in New Orleans
Grosset & Dunlap books
Children's mystery novels